This is a list of wars involving the Federal Democratic Republic of Ethiopia (modern-day Ethiopia) and its predecessor states.

Ethiopian Empire (1137–1975)

Communist Ethiopia (1975–1991)

Federal Democratic Republic of Ethiopia (from 1995)

Footnotes

 
Ethiopia
Wars